Origanum × pulchellum, the showy marjoram, showy oregano, is an ornamental plant of hybrid origin. Its two parents are O. dictamnus and O. sipyleum.

References

External links
DFT Digital Library - Vascular Plant Images: Origanum pulchellum

pulchellum
Hybrid plants